The general-purpose heat source is a U.S. DOE-designed radioactive heat source for radioisotope thermoelectric generators (RTG) or Stirling radioisotope generators (SRG). It is meant for space applications and is packaged as a stackable module.

Characteristics
GPHSs are fueled with plutonium-238 dioxide. Each module has a temperature of over 600 degrees Celsius and delivers 250 watts at the time of manufacture. They measure 9.948 cm wide x 9.32 cm deep x 5.82 cm high and weigh no more than 1.44 kg each.

Safety
GPHSs are designed with safety in mind and employ iridium-clad plutonium-238 dioxide pellets. The generated alpha particles are blocked by the cladding, thus no further radiation shielding is necessary. The pellets are encased within nested layers of carbon-based material and placed within an aeroshell housing to comprise the complete module.

The modules can withstand extreme conditions including a launch-pad explosion or a high-speed reentry. Overheating and impact tests were performed on several sample modules.

Uses
GPHSs of this, or very similar, design were used in the GPHS-RTGs of Cassini-Huygens, New Horizons, the Galileo probe, and the Ulysses probe. They are used in the multi-mission radioisotope thermoelectric generator, as used by Mars Science Laboratory (Curiosity rover). They are also used in the advanced Stirling radioisotope generator.

Stages of assembly

References

 Department of Energy (DOE) Office of Nuclear Energy GPHS article
 "Radioisotope thermoelectric generators (RTGs)" NASA Galileo Information

External links
NASA Radioisotope Power Systems website – GPHS overview

Nuclear power in space